Extremes is the third studio album by American country music artist Collin Raye. As with Raye's first two albums, Extremes received platinum certification in the United States for sales of over one million copies. The singles released from this album were "That's My Story", "Man of My Word", "My Kind of Girl", "If I Were You" and "Little Rock". "My Kind of Girl" was a Number One hit on the Hot Country Songs charts, while the other singles all reached Top Ten.

"Dreaming My Dreams with You" is a cover of the Waylon Jennings song from his album of the same name, and "A Bible and a Bus Ticket Home" was later recorded by Confederate Railroad on their album Keep On Rockin'.

Track listing

Personnel
 Eddie Bayers - drums
 Larry Byrom - acoustic guitar, electric guitar
 Joe Chemay - bass guitar, backing vocals
 Dan Dugmore - steel guitar, lap steel guitar 
 Paul Franklin - steel guitar
 Carl Gorodetzky - strings 
 Rob Hajacos - fiddle
 John Hobbs - piano, synthesizer, string arrangements, backing vocals
 Paul Leim - drums 
 Gene Le Sage - backing vocals
 Anthony Martin - backing vocals
 Nashville String Machine - strings
 Collin Raye - lead vocals, background vocals
 Billy Joe Walker Jr. - acoustic guitar, electric guitar
 Biff Watson - acoustic guitar
 Dennis Wilson - backing vocals
 Lonnie Wilson - drums
 Paul Worley - acoustic guitar, electric guitar
 Scotty Wray - backing vocals
 Curtis Young - backing vocals

Charts

Weekly charts

Year-end charts

Certifications

References

1994 albums
Collin Raye albums
Epic Records albums
Albums produced by Paul Worley